Stary Kuyuk (İśke Köyök) is a rural locality (a selo) in Istyaksky Selsoviet, Yanaulsky District, Bashkortostan, Russia. The population was 246 as of 2010. There are 5 streets.

Geography 
Stary Kuyuk is located 10 km northeast of Yanaul (the district's administrative centre) by road. Istyak is the nearest rural locality.

References 

Rural localities in Yanaulsky District